BCMA may refer to:

 Bar Code Medication Administration, a barcode system designed to prevent medication errors in healthcare settings
 B-cell maturation antigen, a protein that in humans is encoded by the TNFRSF17 gene
 Doctors of BC formerly British Columbia Medical Association, a professional association of doctors in the Canadian province of British Columbia
 Branded Content Marketing Association, the global industry body in the branded content industry.